Peter Bartosiewicz (born 2 August 1942, in Žilina) is a former pair skater who competed for Czechoslovakia. With partner Agnesa Wlachovská, he finished 9th at the 1964 Winter Olympics. He later teamed with Liana Drahová, with whom he was 12th at the 1968 Winter Olympics.

Results

With Wlachovská

With Drahová

References 

Czechoslovak male pair skaters
Slovak male pair skaters
Olympic figure skaters of Czechoslovakia
Figure skaters at the 1964 Winter Olympics
Figure skaters at the 1968 Winter Olympics
Universiade medalists in figure skating
1942 births
Living people
Sportspeople from Žilina
Universiade silver medalists for Czechoslovakia
Competitors at the 1966 Winter Universiade